You Can't Resist is the third studio album by Canadian country music singer-songwriter Patricia Conroy, and was released in 1994 by Warner Music Canada.

On 5 March 1996, Intersound Records released the album in the United States.

Track listing

 "What Else Can I Do" (Tony Arata, Scott Miller) – 4:15
 "You Can't Resist It" (Lyle Lovett) – 3:10
 "Somebody's Leavin'" (Kostas, Matraca Berg) – 4:00
 "Diamonds" (Tom Kimmel, Karen Besbeck) – 3:35
 "The Bridge" (Kimmel, Jim Pitman) – 3:30
 "I Don't Wanna Be the One" (Patricia Conroy) – 3:52
 "Crazy Fool" (Conroy) – 3:18
 "Too True Blue" (George Teren, Susan Longacre) – 3:08
 "Keep Me Rockin'" (Conroy, Jennifer Kimball) – 3:35
 "Home in Your Arms" (Berg, Lisa Silver) – 3:34

Personnel
 Kenny Aronoff – drums, percussion
 Bruce Bouton – pedal steel guitar, lap steel guitar
 Mike Brignardello – bass guitar
 Kathy Burdick – background vocals
 Dennis Burnside – Hammond organ, piano
 Patricia Conroy – lead vocals
 Dan Dugmore – pedal steel guitar, dobro
 Bob Funk – acoustic guitar, electric guitar
 David Grissom – bass guitar, acoustic guitar, electric guitar
 Sue Medley – background vocals
 Brent Rowan – dobro, acoustic guitar, electric guitar, mandolin
 Lisa Silver – background vocals
 Mike Wanchic – background vocals
 Dennis Wilson – background vocals
 Curtis Young – background vocals

Chart performance

Patricia Conroy albums
1994 albums